was a village located in Chichibu District, Saitama Prefecture, Japan.

As of 2003, the village had an estimated population of 1,499 and a density of 4.53 persons per km2. The total area was 330.98 km2.

On April 1, 2005, Ōtaki, along with the town of Yoshida, and the village of Arakawa (all from Chichibu District), was merged into the expanded city of Chichibu and no longer exists as an independent municipality.

External links
  Official website of Chichibu in Japanese

Dissolved municipalities of Saitama Prefecture
Chichibu District, Saitama
Chichibu, Saitama